The 1993 Swiss Indoors was a men's tennis tournament played on indoor hard court at the St. Jakobshalle in Basel, Switzerland that was part of the World Series of the 1993 ATP Tour. It was the 24th edition of the tournament and was held from 26 September until 2 October 1993. Second-seeded Michael Stich, who entered on a wildcard, won the singles title. Future world no. 1 Roger Federer appeared as a ball boy in this tournament.

Finals

Singles

 Michael Stich defeated  Stefan Edberg 6–4, 6–7(5–7), 6–3, 6–2
 It was Stich's 4th singles title of the year and the 11th of his career.

Doubles

 Byron Black /  Jonathan Stark defeated  Brad Pearce /  Dave Randall 3–6, 7–5, 6–3

References

External links
 ITF tournament edition profile

Swiss Indoors
Swiss Indoors
1993 in Swiss tennis